House of Assembly elections were held in Tobago on 29 November 1988 to elect the twelve members of the Tobago House of Assembly. The National Alliance for Reconstruction won eleven seats with 63.69% of the vote, while the People's National Movement won one seat with 35.88% of the vote.

Results

Notes

References

Tobago
Local elections in Trinidad and Tobago
1988 in Trinidad and Tobago